Three ships of the Royal Navy have borne the name HMS Delhi, after the Indian city of Delhi:

 HMS Delhi was the name under which the battleship  was constructed, but she was renamed a month prior to her launch in November 1913.
  was a  light cruiser launched in 1918.  She served in the Second World War and was scrapped in 1948.
  was formerly the  cruiser , transferred to the Royal Indian Navy in 1948, and recommissioned as INS Delhi (C74) when India became a republic in 1950.  She was broken up in 1978.

Royal Navy ship names

fi:HMS Delhi